The SemGroup Championship was a golf tournament for professional female golfers that was part of the LPGA Tour. It was played annually from 2001 to 2008 in Tulsa, Oklahoma.

The tournament was originally known as the Williams Championship, with the Williams Companies as the title sponsor. John Q. Hammons Hotels & Resorts was the title sponsor from 2003 to 2006. In 2007, SemGroup, a Tulsa-based firm providing diversified services for end users and consumers of energy products, took over as the title sponsor. SemGroup filed for bankruptcy protection in July 2008; in November 2008, the LPGA and tournament managers announced that they had been unable to find a replacement sponsor, and that the 2009 tournament would be cancelled. 

Tournament names through the years:
2001-2002: Williams Championship
2003: John Q. Hammons Hotel Classic
2004: John Q. Hammons Hotel Classic presented by Ford
2005-2006: John Q. Hammons Hotel Classic
2007-2008: SemGroup Championship Presented by John Q. Hammons

Winners

* Championship won in sudden-death playoff.

Tournament record

References

External links
LPGA official tournament microsite
Cedar Ridge County Club official website

Former LPGA Tour events
Golf in Oklahoma
Sports in Tulsa, Oklahoma
Women's sports in Oklahoma